Katrin Kieseler is a German-born, Australian sprint canoer who competed from the late 1990s to the mid-2000s. She won a complete set of medals at the ICF Canoe Sprint World Championships with a gold (K-4 500 m: 1997 for Germany), a silver (K-2 1000 m: 2001 for Australia), and a bronze (K-4 1000 m: 2003 for Australia).

References

Australian female canoeists
German female canoeists
German emigrants to Australia
Living people
Year of birth missing (living people)
ICF Canoe Sprint World Championships medalists in kayak